Clay's Way is the debut novel of American writer Blair Mastbaum. Released in 2004 by Alyson Books, this contemporary novel, which won the Lambda Literary Award for LGBT Debut Fiction, follows 15-year-old gay skateboarder Sam and the object of his affection, conflicted surfer Clay around Honolulu.

Reception
Poet and novelist Trebor Healey called Clay's Way "a brilliantly raw and insightful coming-of-age story for a new queer generation" and concluded as "a coming of age novel, it hits pay dirt because, instead of a happy ending, it ends on a note of expansion: Something has happened to Sam that, after the smoke has cleared, causes him to look up at the sky and realize he's no longer Sam the kid, but Sam the man."  The Gay & Lesbian Review found it an "impressive comic debut novel" and that  "Mastbaum’s quirky narrator and comic verve propel the reader through this story of painful yet instructive young love made art for readers of all ages."

References

2004 American novels
Lambda Literary Award-winning works
Gay male teen fiction
American LGBT novels
Novels set in Hawaii
LGBT-related young adult novels
2004 debut novels